On February 8, 2022, two African Parks patrol vehicles in Benin's W National Park were badly damaged by land mines, killing eight people. The incident, believed to have been perpetrated by Islamists, was one of the largest terrorist attacks in the country's history.

Background 
Benin is more stable than most other countries in West Africa, and is one of the few nations to not have a major terrorism problem. However, beginning in late 2021, terrorism began to creep in from abroad, especially from the Sahel, which is to the north. In December 2021, the Porga attack occurred when gunmen (probably from Burkina Faso, which has a jihadist insurgency), raided a military outpost near the town of Porga in Atakora Department, killing two soldiers. In January 2022, a military vehicle collided with an improvised explosive device, killing two people.

Massacre 
On February 8, 2022, a patrol vehicle in W National Park was scouting for poachers when their vehicles hit two land mines planted by the terrorists. Of the eight people killed in the explosion, five were park rangers, one a park official, another a French law enforcement officer, and the other a soldier. Ten people were injured.

Aftermath 
French authorities agreed to launch an investigation after learning that a French citizen was among the dead. African Parks issued a statement that they were working with French and Beninese authorities in response to the massacre. Beninese troops were sent to the park to maintain order. Government authorities also held a meeting to discuss the attack.

On February 10, another roadside bombing killed a civilian and a park ranger. The ranger initially survived the bombing but died after he was attacked by the perpetrators.

On February 10, the French Armed Forces conducted an airstrike on a base held by Jihadist rebels in Southern Burkina Faso. The official motive given was retaliation for the massacre.

References 

2022 in Benin
2022 murders in Africa
African Parks (organisation)
Benin–Burkina Faso relations
Benin–France relations
Burkina Faso–France relations
February 2022 crimes in Africa
February 2022 events in Africa
Improvised explosive device bombings in 2022
Jihadist insurgency in Burkina Faso
Massacres in 2022
Massacres in Benin
Terrorist incidents in Africa in 2022
2022 crimes in Benin
2020s murders in Benin